Millisle, later Millisle for Garlieston was a railway station that was near the junction for Garlieston on the Wigtownshire Railway branch line, from Newton Stewart to Whithorn, of the Portpatrick and Wigtownshire Joint Railway. It served a rural area in Wigtownshire. The line was closed to passenger services in 1950, and to goods in 1964.

History
The station replaced Garliestontown that lay to the north and opened as a terminus in 1876. A shed was located there which was a combined goods shed and engine shed. A passing loop was present and a single platform at the station.

Regular passenger services ceased on the Garlieston branch on 1 March 1903; Millisle was then renamed as Millisle for Garlieston.

The station master's house survives as a private dwelling named Kilfillan Croft.

Micro-history
A Millisle Road Halt railway station existed on the Belfast and County Down Railway which ran from Belfast to Donaghadee in Northern Ireland.

Other stations 
 Newton Stewart - junction
 Causewayend
 Wigtown
 Kirkinner
 Whauphill
 Sorbie
 Garlieston
 Broughton Skeog
 Whithorn

References 
Notes

Sources

External links

 Disused stations

Disused railway stations in Dumfries and Galloway
Former Portpatrick and Wigtownshire Joint Railway stations
Railway stations in Great Britain opened in 1903
Railway stations in Great Britain closed in 1950